Al-'Abisiyya was a Palestinian Arab village in the District of Safad. It was depopulated during the 1948 Arab-Israeli War on May 29, 1948, by The Palmach's First Battalion of Operation Yiftach. It was located 28.5 km northeast of Safad near to the Banyas River which the village relied on for irrigation.

History
The village contained the khirbas of Tall al-Sakhina, Tall al-Shari'a, and al-Shaykh Ghannam.

In 1881, the PEF's Survey of Western Palestine (SWP)  described  the village as "a collection of mud hovels in the plain of the Huleh, on the Nahr Banias containing seventy Moslems. They till the land, which is arable round the village, there is a large supply of  water and some trees near the village."

British Mandate era
In the 1931 census of Palestine, during the  British Mandate for Palestine,  the village had a population of 609, all Muslims, in a total of 31 houses.

In  the 1945 statistics the population of Al-'Abisiyya (including nearby Azaziyat, Ein Fit and  Khirbat es Summan) was  1,220 Muslims, with a total of 15,429 dunams of land, according to an official land and population survey.  Arabs used 4 dunums of land  for citrus and bananas, 6,390 dunams were  plantations and irrigable land, 2,830 for  cereals; while 17 dunams was built-up (urban) area.

1948, aftermath
In May, 1948,  Sde Nehemia requested, "somewhat shamefacedly",  1,700 dunams of land from the newly  depopulated village of Al-'Abisiyya.

References

Bibliography

External links
 Welcome To al-'Abisiyya
al-'Abisiyya (Safed), Zochrot
 Al-'Abisiyya, Villages of Palestine
Survey of Western Palestine, Map 2:   IAA, Wikimedia commons

Arab villages depopulated during the 1948 Arab–Israeli War
District of Safad